Springwater (Barrie Airpark) Aerodrome  is located adjacent to Springwater, Ontario, Canada. The airport supports general aviation aircraft. The aerodrome is located off Highway 400 via Anne Street North.

Tenants

 Aerogroup / Aircraft Sales - sells, operates and maintains small business aircraft
 Barrie Flying Club
 Airport Family Golf Centre & Mini Golf  - mini golf and driving range

See also
 Lake Simcoe Regional Airport
 Barrie/Little Lake Water Aerodrome

References

Registered aerodromes in Ontario
Transport in Barrie
Buildings and structures in Simcoe County